"She Said Yes" is a song co-written and recorded by American country music artist Rhett Akins.  It was released in October 1995 as the fourth and final single from his debut album A Thousand Memories.  The song peaked at number 17 in the United States Billboard Hot Country Singles & Tracks chart and at number 20 on the RPM Country Tracks chart in Canada.  It was written by Akins and Joe Doyle.

Critical reception
Deborah Evans Price, of Billboard magazine reviewed the song favorably, saying that Akins "proves himself to be an able balladeer and insightful songwriter with this sweet ode to young love." She goes on to say that those "images of a boy and girl at a dance, taking those tentative first steps toward a relationship, draw the listener into the song."

Music video
The music video was directed by Mary Newman-Said and premiered in late 1995. It features a couple at a high school dance, who eventually marry and grow old together.

Chart performance
"She Said Yes" debuted at number 63 on the U.S. Billboard Hot Country Singles & Tracks for the week of October 21, 1995.

References

1995 singles
1995 songs
Rhett Akins songs
Songs written by Rhett Akins
Decca Records singles
Song recordings produced by Mark Wright (record producer)